Reading Community City School District, is a school district in Hamilton County, Ohio.

The district has approximately 1,400 students enrolled in grades Kindergarten through grade 12. There is 1 school in the district:
Reading High School (Ohio)

References

School districts in Ohio
Education in Hamilton County, Ohio